Slawski, Sławski (feminine: Sławska), and Ślawski (feminine: Ślawska) are surnames of Polish origin. Notable people include:

 Olga Sławska (1915–1991), Polish ballet dancer and choreographer
 Tadeusz Ślawski (1920–2008), Polish author

See also 
 

Polish-language surnames